The TaylorMade Golf Pebble Beach Invitational is a non-tour professional golf tournament. The event debuted in 1972. The 2019 purse was $300,000 with $60,000 going to the individual winner. There is also a team competition. Professionals from the PGA Tour, LPGA Tour, PGA Tour Champions, and Korn Ferry Tour all compete against each other. Tee placements vary for each tour, based on average driving distances. The event takes place in November of each year.

Winners

Notes

References

External links

Golf in California
Recurring sporting events established in 1972
1972 establishments in California